Sala is a locality and the seat of Sala Municipality in Västmanland County, Sweden. As of 2010, it has a population of 12,289.

Sala is the home of several famous places and people, but it is most known for its silver mine, which today is a popular tourist attraction.

The Sagån River flows south through the locality, en route to Mälaren.

Silver mine

It dates back to at least Medieval times, and was in operation until 1908. In 1624, the town of Sala was moved to its current location close to the mine, receiving its royal charter from King Gustavus Adolphus.

The silver was important for Sweden's economy and the base for coin production. A total of 400 tonnes of silver was extracted, and 40,000 tonnes of lead; with at most 3-5 tonnes of silver during a year.

Amenities

The main streets, in terms of retail outlets, are Drottninggatan (which begins at stora torget — the town square — and runs west to Ekebygatan) and Bergsmansgatan (which begins at stora torget and runs east to Kålgårdsgatan).

Måns Ols Utvärdshus

Måns Ols Utvärdshus is a restaurant on the southeastern shore of Långforsen, a reservoir to the northwest of Sala's centre. The location was originally a dust keeper's home, and its first resident was Måns Olsson, who worked at the silver mine between 1709 and 1748. The building's purpose evolved, and from around 1791 it began serving food and drink. Starting in the summer seasons from the late 19th century, the venue played host to carnivals, performances and competitions. The current building was erected in the 1960s. The Skanevall family took over the business in 2002.

Transportation
Sala's bus and train station is located on Stationsplan, a short semi-circular road off Väsbygatan. About 35 trains from Stockholm Central Station (either directly or indirectly) arrive at the station each day, with around 40 making the return trip. The three high-speed SJ Snabbtåg trips take about one hour and twenty minutes. Journeys on SJ InterCity trains take a similar amount of time and run seven times a day. The slower SJ Regionaltåg trains take just over two hours but make around 20 trips from the capital. There is one SJ Tåg i Bergslagen, which departs Stockholm at 22:14 and is direct to Sala.

The SJ trains that pass through terminate at either Stockholm, Linköping, Falun, Mora (once per day), Uppsala or Västerås.

Sala's airfield, Salanda flygfält, is located just east of highway 56, between Norrkivsta and Kumlaby. It is the home of Salaorten Flying Club (Salaorten Flygklubb), which flies Ultralight UL-B aircraft of type Atec Zephyr.

Climate
Sala has a humid continental climate influenced by both its inland position but also frequent maritime winds reaching the town, moderating winter averages compared to what would be expected for an inland location on its latitude.

Sport
Sala's football club, Sala FF, play in Division 3 Södra Norrland in Sweden's fifth tier. They were founded in December 1972, when IF Norden and IFK Sala merged. Their former home was Silvervallen, but they now play at the sports fields on Sportfältsgatan.

The first floorball club in the world, Sala IBK, was founded in Sala 1979.

Notable people
The impressionist painter Ivan Aguéli was born in Sala in 1869. There is a small museum and a park dedicated to his memory in the centre of the town. Sala is also the domicile of the former Swedish Minister of Foreign Affairs and former Deputy Prime Minister Lena Hjelm-Wallén. She held several ministerial posts in the Social Democratic government in the 1980s and 1990s and has, despite her career in politics, remained in Sala and is still active in local life.

Ice hockey player Erik Ersberg was born here. British horror and thriller writer Steven Savile lives in Sala.

International relations
Sala is twinned with:

Kristinestad, Finland

References

External links
Sala Allehanda news site

Populated places established in 1624
Municipal seats of Västmanland County
Swedish municipal seats
Populated places in Västmanland County
Populated places in Sala Municipality
1624 establishments in Sweden